WDAF-TV (channel 4) is a television station in Kansas City, Missouri, United States, affiliated with the Fox network. The station is owned by Nexstar Media Group, and maintains studios and transmitter facilities on Summit Street in the Signal Hill section of Kansas City, Missouri.

WDAF-TV also serves as an alternate Fox affiliate for the St. Joseph market (which borders the Kansas City market to the north), as the station's transmitter produces a city-grade signal that reaches St. Joseph proper and rural areas in the market's central and southern counties. WDAF previously served as the default NBC station for St. Joseph until it disaffiliated from the network in September 1994 (presently, NBC programming in St. Joseph is provided by KNPG-LD), and as the market's default Fox affiliate from that point on until KNPN-LD (channel 26) signed on as an in-market affiliate on June 2, 2012.

History

As an NBC affiliate
On January 30, 1948, The Kansas City Star Co. – the locally based parent company of the Kansas City Star, which operated as an employee-owned entity at the time – submitted an application to the Federal Communications Commission (FCC) for a construction permit to build and license to operate a television station that would transmit on VHF channel 4. The FCC granted the license for the proposed television station to the Star Co. on the same day; the company subsequently requested to use WDAF-TV (standing for "Why Dial Any Further?") as its call letters, applying the base call sign originally assigned to its radio station on 610 AM (now KCSP; on radio, the WDAF calls now reside on 106.5 FM through a September 2003 format change that also saw the former's country music format move from the AM station, which adopted a sports talk format). (Channel 4 is among a handful of U.S. broadcast stations that is an exception to an FCC rule that assigns call signs prefixed with a "K" to television and radio stations with cities of license located west of the Mississippi River and call signs prefixed with a "W" to stations located east of the river. The anomaly in the case of the WDAF television and radio stations is due to the fact that Kansas City was originally located east of the original "K"/"W" border distinction defined by the FCC at the time that the WDAF call letters were assigned to both stations.)

The station commenced test broadcasts on September 11, 1949, with a three-day event held at Kansas City, Missouri's Municipal Auditorium on West 13th and Central Streets, which was presented by Kansas City Star Co. president Roy A. Roberts and WDAF-TV-AM general manager H. Dean Fitzer. Channel 4 informally signed on the air on September 29, when it broadcast coverage of President Harry S. Truman's speech at the Municipal Auditorium. WDAF-TV officially commenced regular programming two weeks later at 6:00 p.m. on October 16, 1949; the station's first broadcast was The Birth of a TV Station, a special 30-minute documentary inaugurating channel 4's launch, which featured speeches from Roberts and Fitzer as well as topical features on the station's development and a film outlining programs that would air on WDAF. It was the second television station to sign on in Missouri (after KSDK in St. Louis, which debuted in February 1947 as KSD-TV) and the first to sign on in the Kansas City market. WDAF-TV has maintained studio facilities based at 31st and Summit streets in Kansas City, Missouri's Signal Hill neighborhood since its sign-on; the station originally maintained transmitter facilities on a  broadcast tower located atop the building. (Since the transmitter facility was relocated to a tower across the street from the Summit Street studios, on Belleview Avenue near West 30th Street, in 1969, the original tower at the studio facility has remained in use for auxiliary transmissions).

Channel 4 originally operated as a primary affiliate of NBC – an affiliation that was owed to WDAF radio's longtime relationship with the television network's direct predecessor, the NBC Red Network, which it had been affiliated with since 1925 (when the station transmitted on 680 AM) as the network's westernmost affiliate – although it also maintained secondary affiliations with CBS, ABC and the DuMont Television Network. Under Star ownership, the station largely utilized WDAF radio employees to staff the television station; among the notable staffers employed with both stations in its early years included Randall Jessee (who served as WDAF-TV's first news anchor), Shelby Storck (who was the station's first weathercaster), and future Hollywood character actor Owen Bush (who served as an on-staff announcer during the early 1950s). Among the local programs that WDAF aired during its early years included the half-hour daytime talk program The Bette Hayes Show, the 90-minute-long daily children's program Dr. Inventor,  and a weekly television program on religion hosted by Arthur Otto Ackenbom that ran from 1955 to 1956. For several years, WDAF-TV's daily sign-on and sign-off sequence was accompanied by a recording of Gordon MacRae's rendition of "The Lord's Prayer."

The station would lose affiliations with three of the networks from which it cherry-picked programs in the late summer of 1953, when WDAF gained its first commercial television competitors in the Kansas City market. Programming from CBS and DuMont moved to WHB-TV and KMBC-TV (channel 9; KMBC became the sole occupant of that channel in June 1954), which shared affiliations with the two networks when both stations signed on under a timesharing arrangement between their respective licensees, the Cook Paint and Varnish Company and the Midland Broadcasting Company, on August 2 of that year. Channel 4 shared the ABC affiliation with WHB/KMBC until September 27, when KCMO-TV (channel 5, now KCTV) signed on as the network's original full-time Kansas City affiliate (KMBC and KCMO would swap affiliations two years later in September 1955); this left channel 4 as an exclusive affiliate with NBC.

Also in 1953, the U.S. Department of Justice initiated an antitrust investigation against the Star over its ownership of WDAF radio and WDAF-TV; the investigation was reportedly opened at the behest of President Truman, who had been engaged in a long-standing feud with the newspaper over its opposition to the Kansas City native's presidency and his policy proposals. The investigation culminated in the Justice Department filing indictment charges against the Star on the grounds that it engaged in monopolistic practices in its sale of advertising for the newspaper and its television and radio stations. The case was taken to court in 1955, two years after the close of the Truman administration, a federal grand jury found the Star guilty at the end of the one-month restraint-of-trade trial. After attempts to appeal the ruling failed, the Star signed a consent decree in 1957 that required it to stop combining advertising and subscription rates for the newspaper and sell off its broadcasting interests. On May 18, 1958, the WDAF stations were sold to National-Missouri Broadcasters, the broadcasting division of National Theaters.

On July 13, 1960, National-Missouri Broadcasters merged with Buffalo, New York-based Transcontinent Broadcasting. Under Transcontinent ownership, the two stations were joined by an additional sister radio station, WDAF-FM (102.1, now KCKC). Transcontinent merged with Cincinnati-based Taft Broadcasting on February 19, 1964; the transaction was finalized on April 1, 1964.

On July 13, 1984, as NBC began transitioning away from using microwave relays for distribution of its programs to the more economically efficient downlink method, WDAF-TV became one of the first 20 NBC stations to begin receiving the network's programs via satellite transmission. In 1986, it also became the first television station in Kansas City to broadcast in stereo, initially broadcasting NBC network programs and certain syndicated shows that were transmitted in the audio format.

On October 12, 1987, company investors completed a hostile takeover of Taft Broadcasting from the family which owned the company; its new owners restructured the group into the Great American Television and Radio Company (also known as Great American Communications). By that year, WDAF-TV had overtaken KMBC as the dominant station in Kansas City, as was the trend during this period at many NBC-affiliated stations, buoyed by the stronger programming slate that helped the network retake first place in the ratings among the Big Three broadcast networks around that time. In December 1993, Great American Communications underwent another financial restructuring following the company's filing for Chapter 11 bankruptcy. Great American then decided to put most of its television stations up for sale.

As a Fox station

New World Communications ownership
On May 5, 1994, Great American Communications (which would later be renamed Citicasters following the completion of its restructuring) agreed to sell WDAF-TV and three other television stations – CBS affiliate KSAZ-TV in Phoenix, and ABC affiliates WBRC in Birmingham and WGHP in High Point, North Carolina – to New World Communications – for $350 million in cash and $10 million in share warrants; Great American Communications, meanwhile, retained ownership of WDAF radio and sister station KYYS (102.1 FM, now KCKC) until the renamed Citicasters merged with Jacor on February 13, 1996, in a $770 million deal (due to FCC rules at the time that restricted broadcasting companies from owning more than twelve television stations nationwide, WBRC – also due to the agency's prohibition of television station duopolies; New World having purchased Birmingham's NBC affiliate, WVTM-TV, through the Argyle deal – and WGHP were placed in a blind trust and then sold directly to Fox's owned-and-operated station group, Fox Television Stations, in January 1995).

On May 23, 1994, as part of an overall deal in which network parent News Corporation also purchased a 20% equity interest in the group, New World signed a long-term affiliation agreement with Fox to switch thirteen television stations – five that New World had already owned and eight that the company was in the process of acquiring through separate deals with Great American and Argyle Television Holdings (which New World purchased one week later in a purchase option-structured deal for $717 million), including WDAF – to the network. The stations involved in the agreement – all of which were affiliated with one of the three major broadcast networks (CBS, ABC and NBC) – would become Fox affiliates once individual affiliation contracts with each of the stations' existing network partners had expired. The deal was motivated by the National Football League (NFL)'s awarding of the rights to the National Football Conference (NFC) television package to Fox on December 18, 1993, in which the conference's broadcast television rights moved to the network effective with the 1994 NFL season, ending a 38-year relationship with CBS.

At the time the agreement was signed, the affiliation contracts of WDAF-TV and CBS affiliate WJW-TV in Cleveland were up for renewal as they were set to expire on or shortly after September 1, 1994. The timing of New World's purchase of channel 4 and the signing of its affiliation deal with Fox automatically gave NBC only a five-month span until the conclusion of its contract with the station to find another outlet to replace WDAF-TV as its Kansas City affiliate (by comparison, depending on the station, the existing affiliation contracts of most of the other New World stations that were slated to join Fox were not due to expire until as early as December 1994 to as late as September 1996, giving NBC, ABC and CBS more time to find a replacement affiliate). The network entered into negotiations with other area stations in the immediate weeks after the Fox-New World deal was announced, as the projected date of WDAF's switch to Fox was now fast approaching.

NBC first entered into discussions with KCTV for a contract; this concerned CBS, as New World planned to switch several of the network's stronger-performing affiliates in other markets to Fox, which often forced CBS to affiliate with either a former Fox affiliate or a lower-profile independent station, as many of the Big Three stations and – with the exception of Dallas–Fort Worth and Phoenix – some higher-rated independents it approached rejected offers to join CBS due to its faltering ratings and the older-skewing programming slate it had at the time. To prevent such a situation from happening in Kansas City, CBS decided to approach the Meredith Corporation on a proposal to switch two of KCTV's sister stations – NBC affiliate WNEM-TV in Bay City, Michigan and independent station KPHO-TV in Phoenix – to that network as a condition of keeping the CBS affiliation on channel 5; KMBC-TV was automatically eliminated as an option for NBC as it was in the middle of a long-term affiliation agreement between ABC and that station's owner, Hearst Broadcasting. This left existing Fox station KSHB-TV (channel 41) as the only viable option with which NBC could reach an affiliation agreement; the station's owner, Scripps-Howard Broadcasting, would strike an agreement with NBC to affiliate KSHB with the network on August 1, 1994, agreeing to do so on the condition that it carry as much local news programming as WDAF had aired as an NBC affiliate (Scripps excluded KSHB from the affiliation deal it struck with ABC around the same time – which also renewed affiliation contracts with WEWS-TV in Cleveland and WXYZ-TV in Detroit, both of which were approached by CBS to replace newcomer Fox affiliates WJW and WJBK-TV, which had their CBS affiliations displaced through the Fox-New World deal – due to KMBC's existing agreement with the network).

New World finalized its purchase of WDAF-TV and KSAZ on September 9, 1994; WDAF-TV switched to Fox three days later on September 12, ending its affiliation with NBC after 45 years. The final NBC program to air on channel 4 was an NBC Sunday Night Movie premiere of Other People's Money on September 11, 1994, at 8:00 p.m. Central Time. WDAF-TV was the second New World station to switch its network affiliation to Fox through the agreement between the two companies (the first to switch was WJW, which traded affiliations with Cleveland's original Fox affiliate, WOIO, nine days earlier on September 3), and was the only one involved in the deal that had been an NBC affiliate prior to switching networks (WVTM-TV, now owned by Hearst Television and ironically now a sister station to WDAF rival KMBC-TV, and KNSD in San Diego, both of which New World later sold to NBC outright, remained with the network) – the other New World stations that joined Fox were previously affiliated with either CBS or ABC.

As with most of the other New World-owned stations affected by the affiliation agreement with Fox, WDAF-TV retained its existing branding – in its instance, Newschannel 4, which the station adopted as a universal brand in April 1992 as an NBC affiliate – upon the affiliation switch; branding references to Fox, both visually and verbally, were limited in most on-air imaging, with the exception of on-air IDs (which used the tagline "in Kansas City, Newschannel 4 is Fox") that aired until January 1997. In addition to expanding its local news programming, the station added additional syndicated talk shows as well as some reality series and off-network sitcoms to fill time periods that were occupied by NBC's daytime and late-night lineups beforehand, as well as syndicated film packages for broadcast in weekend afternoon timeslots on weeks when Fox did not provide sports programming.

Fox Television Stations ownership
On July 17, 1996, News Corporation announced that it would acquire New World in an all-stock transaction worth $2.48 billion, with the latter company's ten Fox affiliates being folded into the former's Fox Television Stations subsidiary, making them all owned-and-operated stations of the network (the New World Communications name continued as a licensing purpose corporation for WDAF-TV and its sister stations until 2007 under Fox, and from 2009 to 2011 under Local TV ownership); the purchase was finalized on January 22, 1997, making WDAF-TV the first owned-and-operated station of a major network in the Kansas City market since DuMont briefly operated KCTY (channel 25) from December 1953 until it shut down that station in February 1954. On January 26, coinciding with Fox's telecast of Super Bowl XXXI, WDAF-TV subsequently changed its branding from Newschannel 4 to Fox 4 under the network's branding conventions (with its newscasts concurrently rebranding as Fox 4 News).

On June 29, 2001, reports surfaced that Fox Television Stations had reached an agreement to sell WDAF and three of its other owned-and-operated stations – WGHP, WBRC and WHBQ-TV in Memphis, Tennessee (which Fox purchased through a separate agreement with Communications Corporation of America as an ABC affiliate in August 1994) – to New York City-based African American business executive Luther Gatling. The deal was reportedly would have been an effort to free ownership cap space (the four stations covered 2.7% of 40.74% of U.S. television households that Fox had access to one of its owned-and-operated stations) to allow Fox to get under the 35% national market reach allowed by any station group and clear enough room to acquire standalone UPN affiliates in four markets that Fox was in the process of acquiring from Chris-Craft Television. Although representatives at WDAF and WHBQ confirmed the sale, News Corporation stated on July 3 that it had only received an offer from Gatling and had not entered into formal sale negotiations. Fox ultimately never reached a deal with Gatling, and retained ownership of the four stations after the FCC raised the national ownership cap that restricted broadcast groups from owning television stations which reached a combined total of U.S. households from 35% to 39% following an order by the U.S. Court of Appeals issued to justify the limit.

Local TV and Tribune ownership
On December 22, 2007, Fox sold WDAF-TV and seven other owned-and-operated stations – WJW, WBRC, WGHP, KTVI in St. Louis, WITI in Milwaukee, KDVR in Denver and KSTU in Salt Lake City – to Local TV (a broadcast holding company operated by private equity firm Oak Hill Capital Partners that was formed on May 7 of that year to assume ownership of the broadcasting division of The New York Times Company) for $1.1 billion; the sale was finalized on July 14, 2008. On July 1, 2013, the Tribune Company (which in 2008, had formed a joint management agreement involving its Tribune Broadcasting subsidiary and Local TV to operate stations owned by both companies and provide web hosting, technical and engineering services to those run by the latter group) acquired the Local TV stations for $2.75 billion; the sale was completed on December 27.

Aborted sale to Sinclair Broadcast Group; sale to Nexstar Media Group
On May 8, 2017, Hunt Valley, Maryland-based Sinclair Broadcast Group announced that it would acquire Tribune Media for $3.9 billion, plus the assumption of $2.7 billion in debt held by Tribune. If the deal received regulatory approval, WDAF-TV would have been placed under common ownership with Sinclair's existing Missouri-based stations: CBS affiliates KRCG in Jefferson City, KHQA-TV in Hannibal and KTVO in Kirksville, the Cape Girardeau duopoly of Fox affiliate KBSI and MyNetworkTV affiliate WDKA, and ABC affiliate KDNL-TV in St. Louis (which was involved in an ownership conflict with WDAF's sister duopoly of KTVI and CW affiliate KPLR-TV, which Sinclair attempted to sell to the Meredith Corporation before rescinding that deal due to KPLR and Meredith-owned CBS affiliate KMOV both falling among the FCC's "top-four" ratings threshold for duopolies and the U.S. Department of Justice's Antitrust Division wanting to seek further review of the transaction). Less than one month after the FCC voted to have the deal reviewed by an administrative law judge amid "serious concerns" about Sinclair's forthrightness in its applications to sell certain conflict properties, on August 9, 2018, Tribune announced it would terminate the Sinclair deal, intending to seek other M&A opportunities. Tribune also filed a breach of contract lawsuit in the Delaware Chancery Court, alleging that Sinclair engaged in protracted negotiations with the FCC and the DOJ over regulatory issues, refused to sell stations in markets where it already had properties, and proposed divestitures to parties with ties to Sinclair executive chair David D. Smith that were rejected or highly subject to rejection to maintain control over stations it was required to sell. Had the deal been approved, it would have marked a re-entry into Kansas City for Sinclair, which previously owned KSMO-TV from 1994 to 2005, when it sold that station to Meredith to form a duopoly with KCTV.

On December 3, 2018, Irving, Texas-based Nexstar Media Group—which had previously owned ABC affiliate KQTV in St. Joseph from April 1997 until January 2017—announced it would acquire the assets of Tribune Media for $6.4 billion in cash and debt. The deal—which made Nexstar the largest television station operator by total number of stations upon the sale's closure on September 19, 2019—would put WDAF-TV under common ownership with Nexstar's existing virtual clusters in the adjacent markets of Topeka (among NBC affiliate KSNT, Fox affiliate KTMJ-CD and ABC-affiliated SSA partner KTKA-TV) and Joplin (between NBC affiliate KSNF and ABC-affiliated SSA partner KODE-TV). Channel 4 would also retain WHO-DT in Des Moines as a sibling, with Nexstar's current duopoly in that market of WOI-DT and KCWI being sold to Tegna Inc.

Subchannel history

WDAF-DT2
On February 13, 2011, through an agreement between network owner Tribune Broadcasting and then-WDAF-owner Local TV that resulted from the companies' existing management agreement, the station launched a digital subchannel on virtual channel 4.2, which served as a charter affiliate of the Antenna TV classic television network (which had its official nationwide launch just over one month earlier on January 1, with WDAF being one of only four Local TV-owned stations that did not begin carrying Antenna TV on the date of its launch).

WDAF-DT3
On June 22, 2015, WDAF launched a tertiary subchannel on virtual channel 4.3 to serve as an affiliate of This TV (which is also part-owned by Tribune, in conjunction with Metro-Goldwyn-Mayer). The network had been absent from the Kansas City market for five months prior to WDAF's assumption of the affiliation, as KCWE ended its five-year relationship with This TV on January 2, in order to affiliate its second digital subchannel (29.2) with competing film-focused multicast network Movies! (which is part-owned by former This TV co-founder Weigel Broadcasting).

In October 2019, subchannel 4.3 flipped to Court TV, with This TV being moved to KCTV-DT3.

Programming
Syndicated programs broadcast by WDAF-TV (as of September 2020) include Live with Kelly and Ryan, Rachael Ray, Family Feud, Jeopardy!, and Wheel of Fortune (the latter two shows of which WDAF-TV acquired from NBC affiliate KSHB-TV in 2012 and 2020, respectively). WDAF is one of the ten Fox stations to air Jeopardy! and Wheel; the others being WBFF in Baltimore; WSYT in Syracuse, New York; WVUE-DT in New Orleans; WXIX-TV in Cincinnati; WLUK-TV in Green Bay, Wisconsin; KDVR in Denver; KVHP in Lake Charles, Louisiana; WLUC-DT2 in Marquette, Michigan; and WALA-TV in Mobile, Alabama.

WDAF-TV currently carries the majority of the Fox network schedule; however, it delays the network's Saturday late night block (currently, as of September 2016, consisting of reruns of Fox prime time reality series) by a half-hour in order to air its 10:00 p.m. newscast. Channel 4 has only aired Fox's prime time, late night, news and sports programming since it joined the network in September 1994, with the only content it has aired involving Fox's children's programming having been of fall preview specials and network promotions for those blocks that aired within the network's prime time lineup for the final twelve years that Fox carried programming aimed at that demographic. The only notable program preemption outside of the network's children's blocks has been that of the secondary Sunday morning NFL pre-game show Fox NFL Kickoff, of which WDAF had declined carriage for the 2015 regular season (the program moved to Fox from Fox Sports 1 in September 2015), with the station's second digital subchannel airing it instead in its network-recommended time slot; WDAF began clearing Fox NFL Kickoff in September 2016.

During its first four decades with NBC, WDAF-TV preempted moderate amounts of the network's programming, usually consisting of some daytime shows and an occasional prime time program. Among the notable programs that were preempted by channel 4 included Days of Our Lives (which was preempted by the station from its November 1965 debut until 1971), the 1967 reboot of Dragnet (which was dropped by WDAF-TV after the police procedural's first season, before the station decided to re-permit clearance of the program at the start of its third season in September 1969, albeit airing on delay on Saturday afternoons; the station eventually began airing the show in pattern on Thursdays towards the end of its run), I Dream of Jeannie (which the station began preempting partway through its first season in 1966, before it resumed carrying the show in the fall of 1968), and The Name of the Game (which it replaced with the country music programs Country Hayride and The Stan Hitchcock Show during its second season). Although NBC had long been less tolerant of affiliates preempting its programming than the other broadcast networks were, it usually did not raise objections to those made by WDAF-TV. The issue was rectified between 1969 and 1971, as most of the NBC shows that the station chose to preempt would air instead on independent station KCIT-TV (channel 50, now Ion Television owned-and-operated station KPXE-TV; the KCIT calls now reside on a Fox-affiliated television station in Amarillo, Texas).

As with most of its sister stations under its former New World ownership (with the subverted exception of St. Louis sister station KTVI), WDAF-TV has always declined carriage of Fox's children's programming; it opted not to run the Fox Kids weekday and Saturday blocks when it affiliated with the network, airing children's programs acquired via syndication on Saturday mornings instead (the preemptions of Fox Kids by the New World stations led the network to change its carriage policies to allow Fox stations uninterested in carrying the block the right of first refusal to transfer the local rights to another station, restructuring Fox Kids as a network-syndicated program package; by 2001, affiliates were no longer required to run the Fox Kids lineup even if Fox had not secured a substitute carrier). Fox Kids aired locally on KSMO-TV from 1994 to 1998; KCWE (channel 29, now a CW affiliate) from 1998 to 1999; and finally – along with its successor blocks FoxBox and 4Kids TV – on KMCI (channel 38) from 1999 to 2008. Fox ended its network-supplied children's programming on December 28, 2008, replacing it thereafter with the paid programming block Weekend Marketplace, which is not carried by any Kansas City area station. On September 13, 2014, WDAF began carrying Xploration Station, a live-action educational program block distributed by Steve Rotfeld Productions that is syndicated primarily to Fox stations, on Saturday mornings through an agreement involving Tribune's Fox-affiliated stations.

Sports programming
WDAF-TV began serving as the unofficial "home" television station of the Kansas City Chiefs in 1965, when NBC obtained the television rights to the American Football League (AFL), which was annexed into the National Football League (NFL) – as the American Football Conference (AFC) – when the two professional football leagues merged in 1970. The station carried most regional or national Chiefs game telecasts aired by NBC through the 1993 season; the local rights to the Chiefs broadcasts transferred to KSHB after it assumed the NBC affiliation from WDAF in September 1994 and remained there until the network's contract with the AFC expired after the 1997 season (KSHB would resume airing certain regular season games involving the Chiefs in 2006, when NBC obtained the rights to the Sunday Night Football package). The loss of primary broadcast rights to the Chiefs by WDAF – one of two Fox affiliates affected by the New World agreement that is located in an AFC market, alongside WJW, which is located in the home market of the Cleveland Browns – differs from the situations in other former New World markets, mainly where it bought or already owned stations that were previously affiliated with CBS, in which the affected stations continued their relationships with a local NFL franchise after they switched to Fox (albeit with brief interruptions in these arrangements in cities such as Milwaukee, Atlanta and Dallas, where Fox's assumption of the NFC rights predated some of the stations' affiliation switches by several months).

As a Fox station, since the network obtained partial broadcast rights to the NFL in 1994, Chiefs game telecasts on WDAF during the regular season have been limited to regionally televised interconference games against opponents in the National Football Conference (NFC), primarily those held at Arrowhead Stadium, and since 2014, cross-flexed games originally scheduled to air on CBS in which the team plays against a fellow AFC team. However, Channel 4 held broadcast rights to preseason games involving the team from 1997 to 2001 through a partnership with the Chiefs Television Network; during this period, the on-air production presentation of the locally exclusive telecasts was upgraded to network quality standards by way of WDAF's then-ownership under Fox. Currently, most regular season and some preseason games shown over-the-air locally are televised by KCTV, which has served as the Chiefs' preseason broadcaster since 2002, four years after CBS took over the AFC television rights when that station became the team's primary local broadcaster and carrier of analysis and magazine programs produced by the team's production unit. WDAF-TV also carried the Chiefs' victories in Super Bowls LIV (the team's first championship in 50 years) and LVII.

WDAF-TV also served as the over-the-air flagship station of the Kansas City Royals from 1979 to 1992; this relationship continued long after many Big Three-affiliated stations discontinued regular coverage of local sporting events, including those involving Major League Baseball (MLB) franchises. In addition, from 1969 until the network lost the rights to the MLB Game of the Week in 1989 and sporadically during part of the strike-shortened 1994 season, the station also carried certain regular season and postseason games featuring the Royals that NBC televised nationally (it also aired any nationally televised games of the city's first MLB team, the Kansas City A's from 1955 to 1967). Since Fox obtained the partial (now exclusive) over-the-air network television rights to the league in 1996, WDAF has carried certain Royals games that have been regionally televised (and, since 2013, select national telecasts scheduled during prime time) by the network during the league's regular season and postseason. Notable Royals telecasts that the station has aired during its tenures with NBC and Fox have included the team's World Series appearances in 1980, 2014 and 2015, the first having been aired by NBC and the two most recent appearances being carried by Fox, the latter of which saw the franchise win its first world championship title since 1985.

News operation

, WDAF-TV presently broadcasts 67 hours of locally produced newscasts each week (with 11½ hours on weekdays, 4½ hours on Saturdays and five hours on Sundays); in regards to the number of hours devoted to news programming, it is the highest local newscast output among the Kansas City market's commercial television stations. WDAF-TV's Sunday 5:00 p.m. newscast is subject to preemption due to network sports coverage, as is standard with Fox stations that carry early-evening newscasts on weekends (though the Saturday 5:00 p.m. newscast is usually delayed to 6:00 p.m. during the baseball or college football seasons, if Fox is only scheduled to air a daytime game telecast). The station operates a Hummer, branded as "Storm Fox", which the station primarily uses as a storm chasing vehicle to cover severe weather events affecting its viewing area.

News department history
Local news has always maintained an important presence at WDAF-TV throughout its history, an ideology fitting of a station that was founded by a newspaper. Dating back to its NBC affiliation, channel 4 has long battled KMBC-TV (and at times, KCTV as well) for the most-watched local television newscast in the Kansas City market for the better part of four decades. During the late 1970s and 1980s, WDAF-TV's newscasts sat in second place in the ratings, behind KMBC; however, coinciding with the rise of NBC's ratings fortunes during that period, it ended the latter decade in first place, overtaking KCTV for the top spot. In 1982, WDAF-TV became the first television station in Kansas City to use a helicopter for newsgathering; the helicopter (originally known as "Chopper 4" until 1992, then as "NewsChopper 4" from 1992 to 1999, and later "Sky Fox" thereafter) was used to provide aerial coverage of breaking news and severe weather events, and periodically for traffic reports during its weekday morning and 5:00 p.m. newscasts; the helicopter was grounded by station management on August 31, 2009, citing budget issues with the leasing of the helicopter.

Also in 1982, WDAF launched a feature titled "Thursday’s Child," a segment that aired weekly during its 10:00 p.m. newscast, which highlighted Kansas City area children in the foster care system who were seeking adoptive families; the segment was produced by the WDAF news department, in conjunction with the Love Fund for Children, a charity founded through a $1,200 endowment from several WDAF-TV employees. In September 1984, the station debuted a 20-minute local sports news program within the Sunday edition of its 10:00 p.m. newscast, The Kansas City Sports Machine, which borrowed its title from the syndicated The George Michael Sports Machine, which aired on WDAF from 1982 until it concluded its syndication run in September 2007; the WDAF version lasted until 1999, when it evolved into a conventional sports segment within the Sunday 10:00 newscast.

When WDAF-TV adopted the Newschannel 4 brand in April 1992, the station also implemented the "24-Hour News Source" concept (which was enforced in the promotional slogan used by the station until 1999, "Kansas City's 24-Hour Newschannel"). Its iteration of the concept involved both the production of 30-second news updates that aired at or near the top of each hour during local commercial break inserts – even during prime time network and overnight programming – and five-second end-of-break weather updates (consisting of an image of the station's Doppler radar, then known as "Doppler 4 Radar", usually accompanied by a brief voiceover by one of the station's meteorologists illustrating the short-term forecast or teasing the weather segment in an upcoming newscast), during time periods when the station was not airing its regularly scheduled, long-form newscasts. In September 1992, WDAF became the first television station in Kansas City to launch a weekend morning newscast, with the debut of two-hour-long Saturday and Sunday broadcasts that initially aired from 8:00 to 10:00 a.m. (both editions would later move to 7:00 to 9:00 a.m. in September 1997, with the Saturday edition moving one hour earlier on April 23, 2016).

After WDAF became a Fox affiliate on September 12, 1994, the station underwent a major shift in its programming philosophy that more heavily emphasized its local news programming. It retained a news schedule similar to the one it had as an NBC affiliate, but increased its news output from about 25 hours to nearly 45 hours per week by expanding existing newscasts and adding ones in new time periods (with its weekday news schedule expanding from 3½ hours to seven hours per day). In its early years with Fox, local news programming on the station ran on weekdays from 6:00 to 9:00 a.m., 12:00 to 1:00 p.m. and 5:00 to 6:30 p.m. and nightly from 9:00 to 10:30 p.m., as well as on weekend mornings and early evenings. The station retained the "24-Hour News Source" format after the affiliation switch, continuing to offer news updates on an hourly basis during commercial breaks until it discontinued the concept in May 1999. With New World Communications heavily investing in the news department's expansion, WDAF increased its news staff from 80 to 120 employees; it hired up to 40 additional employees (including additional reporters and behind-the-scenes staff members) to handle the expanded news coverage that the new news-intensive lineup would allow.

The weekday morning newscast's expansion from one to three hours – with the addition of a two-hour extension from 7:00 to 9:00 a.m. – and the consolidation of its half-hour weeknight 5:00 and 6:00 p.m. newscasts into a single 90-minute block – although the early-evening block was structured as three separate half-hour broadcasts – filled timeslots vacated by the departures of Today and NBC Nightly News from its schedule as Fox, unlike NBC, does not have daily national news programs. The weekday morning newscast would gradually expand over time, eventually attaining its current 5½-hour format with the addition of an hour-long block at 9:00 a.m. on March 24, 2011, and a half-hour early extension at 4:30 a.m. on October 3 of that year. Since Fox does not provide network programming during that hour, Channel 4 also added an hour-long prime time newscast at 9:00 p.m. – originally titled Newschannel 4 Primetime until January 1997 and then Fox 4 News: Primetime at 9:00 until September 1999, when it was renamed as simply Fox 4 News at 9:00 – to lead into its existing 10:00 p.m. newscast (WDAF is one of several Fox stations that offer newscasts in both the final hour of prime time and the traditional late news time slot – as well as one of the few affiliated with the network that runs a nightly newscast in the latter slot – and one of ten that continued its Big Three-era late-evening newscast after switching to Fox); the addition marked the first time WDAF had aired a local newscast at that hour since its days as a hybrid NBC/ABC/CBS/DuMont affiliate, when the station aired its late-evening newscast at 9:30 from its sign-on in September 1949 until the program moved to 10:00 p.m. after the station became a full-time NBC affiliate in September 1953.

On January 15, 1996, WDAF-TV reformatted its 5:30 p.m. newscast as Your World Tonight, a program focusing primarily on national and international news headlines that was modeled similarly to the national news programs of ABC, CBS and NBC (as with the national newscasts that Your World Tonight competed directly against, the program maintained a single-anchor format, with Phil Witt – who joined WDAF in August 1979 as a weekend evening anchor/reporter, before being promoted to main co-anchor of the weekday evening newscasts in 1981, a role in which he remained until Witt retired from broadcasting on June 20, 2017 – at the helm). Because Fox did not have a news division – and by association, an affiliate news service – at the time WDAF joined the network, the program – as was the case with WDAF's news department as a whole since the September 1994 switch to Fox – initially relied mainly on external video feeds from CNN Newsource for coverage of national and international news stories, although with the associated launch of Fox News Channel that August, it also added content sourced from Fox's in-house affiliate video service Fox News Edge. The Your World Tonight concept was not successful, and the 5:30 p.m. broadcast was retooled as a traditional local newscast, formatted as an extension of its lead-in 5:00 broadcast, on January 6, 1997.

Not long after WDAF-TV switched to Fox, KMBC made a short resurgence in news viewership amid viewer confusion caused by the switch, overtaking it for first place among the market's local television newscasts; this situation would further intensify the ratings rivalry between the two stations. Since the late 1990s, WDAF-TV's newscasts have rotated between first and second place with either KMBC or KCTV depending on the time slot, with the station's strongest ratings being logged in the morning and at 9:00 p.m., where WDAF regularly finishes at No. 1 (in time periods where that station does not have an absolute hold in that position, WDAF competes for second place with CBS affiliate KCTV). Channel 4 has maintained its status as the ratings leader in the 9:00 p.m. hour, even as it has faced added competition in recent years from a KCTV-produced newscast on MyNetworkTV-affiliated sister station KSMO-TV (which premiered on the latter station as a WB affiliate on September 12, 2005) and a KMBC-produced newscast on that station's CW-affiliated sister KCWE (which began as a half-hour program on September 14, 2010).

In February 2003, WDAF-TV launched an investigative reporting unit, the "Fox 4 Problem Solvers", which conduct investigative reports centering on businesses that have ripped off local consumers and uncovers various consumer scams. In April 2007, fellow Fox affiliate KTMJ-CA in Topeka began simulcasting the 7:00 to 9:00 a.m. block of WDAF-TV's weekday morning newscast and its nightly 9:00 p.m. newscast (ironically, the over-the-air signals of WDAF-TV and several other Kansas City area stations adequately cover most of the nearby Topeka market due to the close proximity of the two markets, Topeka being located  due west of Kansas City). The simulcasts were dropped in November 2008, when KTMJ's earlier purchase by New Vision Television led to their replacement by locally based newscasts produced by its NBC-affiliated sister station KSNT.

On October 12, 2010, WDAF-TV became the fourth (and last) television station in the Kansas City market to begin broadcasting its local newscasts in high definition. On April 11, 2011, the station extended its existing pre-Fox-era late newscast, with the debut of a separate 10:30 p.m. news program on Sunday through Friday nights (Fox late night programming airs on Saturdays during that half-hour); as a result, it became the first Fox station – and one of only a handful of television stations in the Central and Mountain time zones – to expand its 10:00 p.m. newscast to a full hour, a format more common in that timeslot with prime time newscasts aired on Fox stations and non-major-network outlets in the Eastern and Pacific Time Zones.

Notable former on-air staff
 Mark Alford – weekday anchor (1998–2021; now elected to the United States House of Representatives in )
 Owen Bush – station announcer (1950s; deceased)
 Jack Cafferty – news and weather anchor (now a news commentator for CNN)
 Harris Faulkner – evening anchor (1992–2000; now at Fox News Channel)
 Gayle King – anchor/reporter (1978–1981; now at CBS News as co-host of CBS This Morning)
 Stacy Smith – evening anchor (1977–1983; moved to KDKA-TV in Pittsburgh, retired in May 2021) 
 Shelby Storck – weather anchor (1950s–1960s; deceased)
 Bob Wells – announcer and weekend weatherman (1959–1965; later at WJW-TV in Cleveland, now an actor/announcer in the Tampa Bay area)

Technical information

Subchannels
The station's digital signal is multiplexed:

Analog-to-digital conversion
WDAF-TV's digital signal was upgraded to full-power high definition on September 23, 2005, increasing its HD signal strength from 1.2 kW to 1,000 kW. The station shut down its analog signal, over VHF channel 4, on June 12, 2009, at 9:01 a.m., the official date in which full-power television stations in the United States transitioned from analog to digital broadcasts under federal mandate. WDAF continued to transmit its digital signal on its pre-transition UHF channel 34. Through the use of PSIP, digital television receivers display the station's virtual channel as its former VHF analog channel 4.

References

External links
 
 WDAF-DT2 website

Television stations in the Kansas City metropolitan area
Fox network affiliates
Antenna TV affiliates
Court TV affiliates
TBD (TV network) affiliates
Nexstar Media Group
Television channels and stations established in 1949
National Football League primary television stations
New World Communications television stations
Taft Broadcasting
Former News Corporation subsidiaries
1949 establishments in Missouri